Ingrid Marieke Leary (born ) is a New Zealand politician. In 2020 she was elected as a Member of Parliament in the House of Representatives for the Labour Party.

Early life and career
Leary completed secondary schooling at Macleans College in Auckland before studying law at the University of Otago. She worked as a lawyer, parliamentary press secretary, university lecturer and broadcaster before entering Parliament. She helped to set up the journalism school in the University of the South Pacific in 1997, and lectured there on journalism. When she resigned in 1999 to take up a role in TV production in New Zealand, she was critical of the Fiji government's approach to the media.

In 2006 Leary received the New Zealand Special Service Medal for her broadcasting work in the aftermath of the 2004 Indian Ocean earthquake and tsunami in Aceh.

In 2009, as a producer for Campbell Live, Leary was summonsed by the New Zealand Police to appear before a depositions hearing about the theft of 96 medals from the National Army Museum in Waiouru. Campbell Live had broadcast an interview with a man who claimed to have participated in the burglary; the police sought the identity of the programme's informant. Lawyers for Leary and four other staff argued that journalists should not have to reveal sources unless the circumstances were exceptional, because it could discourage future sources to come forward, and that the threshold for this was not met in that case. Judge Tony Randerson decided that public interest in a successful prosecution outweighed a journalist's right to protect a source; Campbell Live presenter John Campbell later agreed to assist police without naming his source.

Leary was press secretary for National MP Maurice Williamson,  and she later served as the director of the British Council New Zealand from 2008 to 2020.

Campaign 
Leary was selected as the Labour candidate for the  electorate, later renamed Taieri, ahead of Rachel Brooking and Simon McCallum. During the campaign, New Zealand First list MP Mark Patterson publicly queried her commitment to the electorate, as she had admitted spending lockdown on Waiheke island. Leary claimed to be the victim of a smear campaign, as she had studied law in Dunedin, and had relocated to Dunedin with her family, including a child attending school in Dunedin, prior to her selection for the seat.

Member of Parliament

Leary was elected with a majority of 12,398 over the National candidate Liam Kernaghan in the final count. She said she was hoping for a role in justice, social enterprise or issues relating to seniors.

By August 2022, Leary had joined the Inter-Parliamentary Alliance on China (IPAC), an organisation of legislators from various democratic countries that speaks out against alleged human rights abuses in China and the alleged threat that China posed to its neighbours. On 22 August, Lear and fellow New Zealand IPAC member and National Party Member of Parliament Simon O'Connor joined fellow members from Australia, India and Japan in establishing a new Indo-Pacific chapter to focus on increased Chinese militarisation in that region.

Leary inherited Louisa Wall's member's bill (the Protection of Journalists' Sources Bill) upon her retirement in May 2022. At that stage the Bill was being considered by the Justice Committee. In September 2022, Leary withdrew the Bill because of "insurmountable drafting issues" discovered through the legislative process, saying she would work on replacement legislation.

Family 
Leary is a mother of three, and lives in Dunedin with her family.

References

|-

1960s births
Living people
New Zealand Labour Party MPs
Women members of the New Zealand House of Representatives
New Zealand broadcasters
21st-century New Zealand women politicians